Take Aim  is a studio album by American hard bop tenor saxophonist Harold Land. The album was recorded in Los Angeles in 1960 but released only in 1980 via Blue Note label. This rare record was re-released on CD in 2005 and 2012.

Reception
George Harris of All About Jazz stated "Take Aim has all of the features of classic hard bop: tight ensemble work, creative and hard-driving solos, and crisp rhythm work. It makes you wonder where Leon Pettis has been all these years. At times, the drummer sounds like thunder from on high as he pushes this band. Martin Banks is articulate and has that Brownie quality in his trumpet solos. Of course, Land, with an immediately identifiable rough yet light sound, is the epitome of hard bop. His music sounds as fresh today as the moment it was recorded over forty years ago."

Scott Yanow of Allmusic wrote "This little-known Blue Note session by tenor saxophonist Harold Land went unreleased until this 1980 LP. Land and an obscure supporting cast (trumpeter Martin Banks, pianist Amos Trice, bassist Clarence Jones, and drummer Leon Pettis) perform five hard bop originals and a lyrical "You're My Thrill." The performances, which are now hard to find, should interest Land collectors and fans of the era's modern mainstream jazz, although overall the results are not that memorable."

Track listing

Personnel
Harold Land – tenor saxophone
Martin Banks – trumpet
Amos Trice – piano
Clarence Jones – bass
Leon Pettis – drums

References

Harold Land albums
1980 albums